Robert George Good (born September 11, 1965) is an American politician who is the U.S. representative in Virginia's 5th congressional district. He is a member of the Republican Party.

Early life and education 
Good was born in Wilkes-Barre, Pennsylvania, and lived in North Jersey before moving to Lynchburg, Virginia, with his family at age nine. He attended Liberty Christian Academy, where he was a member of the wrestling team. Good was awarded a partial wrestling scholarship to Liberty University, where he earned a Bachelor of Science in finance and a Master of Business Administration.

Career 
For 17 years, Good worked for Citi Financial. When he announced his campaign for Congress in 2019, he was serving as an associate athletic director for development at Liberty University.

Good was a member of the Campbell County Board of Supervisors from 2016 to 2019. During his three years as a county supervisor, he supported socially conservative causes, voting to condemn the U.S. Supreme Court decision recognizing a constitutional right to same-sex marriage; to declare the county a "Second Amendment sanctuary"; and to call upon the Virginia General Assembly to restrict transgender bathroom use.

U.S. House of Representatives

Elections

2020 

He defeated Riggleman with 58% of the vote from party delegates during a drive-through nominating convention instead of a primary election. During the campaign, Good criticized Riggleman for officiating at the same-sex wedding of two former campaign volunteers.

Good campaigned on a far-right platform, espousing hard-line views on immigration policy and opposition to same-sex marriage and aligning himself with President Donald Trump. He called for the repeal of the Affordable Care Act and rejected public health measures to combat the spread of the COVID-19 pandemic. He did not wear a face covering or encourage the wearing of face coverings at campaign events, and opposed restrictions on businesses to slow the spread of the virus. Good suggested that the wearing of face coverings might be harmful. In the November 3 general election, Good defeated Democratic nominee Cameron Webb, a physician, 52.6% (210,988) to 47.4% (190,315).

Tenure 
After his election, Good appeared amid the pandemic at a rally in Washington, D.C., in which Trump supporters protested the Supreme Court's rejection of a lawsuit attempting to subvert the results of the election, which Trump lost to Joe Biden. During the rally, Good promoted the theory that Democrats had perpetrated a vast conspiracy to steal the election. He said that while the virus was real, the pandemic was "phony". Good told a maskless crowd that "this is a phony pandemic" and, the next day, suggested that precautions to prevent the spread of the disease were a "hoax".

On January 6, 2021, Good voted against certifying the election of President-elect Biden. On January 17, he voted against a House bill awarding Congressional Gold Medals to the U.S. Capitol Police and the District of Columbia Metropolitan Police Department for their roles in protecting the Capitol and members of Congress during the storming of the United States Capitol. He and 20 other House Republicans voted against a similar resolution in June 2021.

On June 26, 2021, Good appeared at Bedford County, Virginia's, second annual militia muster, saying he was happy to be at the event with "proud patriots and constitutional conservatives who are doing their part to help strengthen our nation and to fight for the things that we believe in".

In June 2021, Good was one of 49 House Republicans to vote to repeal the AUMF against Iraq.

In July 2021, Good voted against the bipartisan ALLIES Act, which would have increased the number of special immigrant visas for Afghan allies of the U.S. military by 8,000 during its invasion of Afghanistan while also reducing some application requirements that caused long application backlogs. The bill passed the House 407–16.

In September 2021, Good was among 75 House Republicans to vote against the National Defense Authorization Act of 2022, which contains a provision that would require women to register for selective service.

On October 26, 2021, while the House discussed anti-domestic violence legislation, Good said: "Nearly everything that plagues our society can be attributed to a failure to follow God's laws for morality and his rules for and definition of marriage and family."

In October 2021, Good encouraged a group of high school students from Rappahannock County, Virginia, to defy a local school mask mandate, saying, "If nobody in Rappahannock complies, they can't stop everyone".

In November 2021, Good wrote Virginia Governor-elect Glenn Youngkin a letter asking him to halt a federal mask mandate once he took office.

Good was among 19 House Republicans to vote against the final passage of the 2022 National Defense Authorization Act.

On January 11, 2022, Good urged fellow Republicans to boycott the Capitol Hill Club, a popular dining spot for Republican officials, after it mandated that all guests must show proof of COVID-19 vaccination.

On March 1, 2022, Good said he would not attend President Joe Biden's State of the Union address: "President Biden subjected the country to life-altering mandates for over a year. I will not submit to an unnecessary COVID test to attend a State of the Union only to hear this president whisper through a speech that will inevitably fail to take responsibility for the tremendous damage he has and continues to cause to our country."

In August 2022, Good's Democratic opponent, Josh Throneburg, challenged him to a debate. As of August 15, 2022, Good had not responded to the challenge.

In 2022, Good was one of 39 Republicans to vote for the Merger Filing Fee Modernization Act of 2022, an antitrust package that would crack down on corporations for anti-competitive behavior.

Good has been a supporter of efforts to impeach President Joe Biden. During the 117th United States Congress, Good was co-sponsor of three resolutions to impeach President Biden. Good also co-sponsored a resolution to impeach Vice President Kamala Harris and another resolution to impeach Secretary of Homeland Security Alejandro Mayorkas. During the 118th Congress, Good cosponsored another resolution to impeach Mayorkas.

Syria 
In 2023, Good was among 47 Republicans to vote in favor of H.Con.Res. 21 which directed President Joe Biden to remove U.S. troops from Syria within 180 days.

Committee assignments 

 Committee on Education and Labor
 Committee on Budget

Caucus memberships 

 Freedom Caucus
Republican Study Committee

Personal life 
Good and his wife, Tracey, have three children. They live in Evington, southwest of Lynchburg.

Good has described himself as a born-again Christian and a "biblical conservative".

Electoral history

References

External links 

 Representative Bob Good official U.S. House website
 Campaign website
 
 

|-

1965 births
Living people
American Protestants
American evangelicals
American nationalists
Christians from Virginia
Citigroup employees
County supervisors in Virginia
Liberty University alumni
Liberty University faculty
People from Campbell County, Virginia
Protestants from Virginia
Republican Party members of the United States House of Representatives from Virginia
Right-wing populism in the United States
21st-century American politicians
Far-right politicians in the United States